Pedro Nuno dos Santos Soares (born 3 November 1987) is a Portuguese football player who plays for C.D. Trofense.

Club career
He made his professional debut in the Segunda Liga for Arouca on 29 August 2010 in a game against Santa Clara.

References

External links
 

1987 births
Footballers from Porto
Living people
Portuguese footballers
F.C. Maia players
F.C. Arouca players
Liga Portugal 2 players
F.C. Tirsense players
Varzim S.C. players
C.D. Santa Clara players
AD Fafe players
C.D. Trofense players
Association football goalkeepers
G.D. Gafanha players